Tirupati Municipal Corporation is the civic body that governs the city of Tirupati in the Indian state of Andhra Pradesh. It is one of the three corporations in the state, alongside Kakinada and Visakhapatnam to feature in Smart City project. Established in the year 2007, the executive power of the TMC is vested in the Municipal Commissioner, an Indian Administrative Service (IAS) officer appointed by the Government of Andhra Pradesh. The position is held by Anupama Anjali. Dr. BR.Shirisha Yadav (YSRCP) was elected as the Mayor and M.Narayana (YSRCP) as the Deputy Mayor by the newly elected general body in March 2021.Municipal Corporation mechanism in India was introduced during British Rule with formation of municipal corporation in Madras (Chennai) in 1688, later followed by municipal corporations in Bombay (Mumbai) and Calcutta (Kolkata) by 1762.

Timeline 

The Tirupati Municipality was formed on 1 April 1886. The municipality saw many gradations over the years and formed as municipal corporation on 2 March 2007. The following table shows the timeline of the municipality:

Civic administration 

The corporation population as per the 2011 census was 374,260. the present commissioner of the corporation is Anupama Anjali IAS.

Functions 
Tirupati Municipal Corporation is created for the following functions:

 Planning for the town including its surroundings which are covered under its Department's Urban Planning Authority .

 Approving construction of new buildings and authorising use of land for various purposes.

 Improvement of the town's economic and Social status.

 Arrangements of water supply towards commercial,residential and industrial purposes.

 Planning for fire contingencies through Fire Service Departments.

 Creation of solid waste management,public health system and sanitary services.

 Working for the development of ecological aspect like development of Urban Forestry and making guidelines for environmental protection.

 Working for the development of weaker sections of the society like mentally and physically handicapped,old age and gender biased people.

 Making efforts for improvement of slums and poverty removal in the town.

Revenue sources 

The following are the Income sources for the Corporation from the Central and State Government.

Revenue from taxes  
Following is the Tax related revenue for the corporation.

 Property tax.
 Profession tax.
 Entertainment tax.
 Grants from Central and State Government like Goods and Services Tax.
 Advertisement tax.

Revenue from non-tax sources 

Following is the Non Tax related revenue for the corporation.

 Water usage charges.
 Fees from Documentation services.
 Rent received from municipal property.
 Funds from municipal bonds.

Revenue from taxes  
Following is the Tax related revenue for the corporation.

 Property tax.
 Profession tax.
 Entertainment tax.
 Grants from Central and State Government like Goods and Services Tax.
 Advertisement tax.

Revenue from non-tax sources 

Following is the Non Tax related revenue for the corporation.

 Water usage charges.
 Fees from Documentation services.
 Rent received from municipal property.
 Funds from municipal bonds.

Municipal elections

2021 Ordinary Elections

References 

Municipal corporations in Andhra Pradesh
Buildings and structures in Tirupati
2007 establishments in Andhra Pradesh
1886 establishments in India